Altensteinia is a genus of orchids. It is found in the Andean region of South America. At present (May 2014), eight species are accepted.

List of species 
 Altensteinia boliviensis  Rolfe ex Rusby (1895) - Peru, Bolivia
 Altensteinia citrina  Garay (1978) - Ecuador
 Altensteinia cundinamarcae S.Nowak, Szlach. & Mytnik, 2014 - Colombia (Cundinamarca). 
 Altensteinia elliptica  C.Schweinf. (1951) - Peru
 Altensteinia fimbriata  Kunth (1816) - type species - Venezuela, Bolivia, Colombia, Ecuador, Peru 
 Altensteinia longispicata  C.Schweinf. (1941) - Peru
 Altensteinia marginata  Rchb.f. (1878) - Peru
 Altensteinia virescens  Lindl. (1845) - Colombia, Ecuador

References

External links 

Cranichidinae
Cranichideae genera
Flora of the Andes
Orchids of Peru
Orchids of Venezuela
Orchids of Bolivia
Orchids of Colombia